Westerfeld is a surname of Germanic origin. Notable people with the surname include:

Scott Westerfeld (born 1963), American science fiction author
Stephanie Westerfeld (1943–1961), American figure skater

See also
Westerveld

Germanic-language surnames